Makhmud Muradov (born 8 February 1990) is a Tajik-born Uzbek professional mixed martial artist, former professional kickboxer and amateur combat sambist fighting out of Bukhara, Uzbekistan and Prague, Czech Republic. He is currently signed to the Ultimate Fighting Championship (UFC) Middleweight division.

Background
Makhmud Muradov  was born on February 8, 1990, in Soviet Tajikistan, to a father who was a Tajik national and a mother who was from Soviet Uzbekistan. In 1993, he fled as a refugee with his family to his mother's native Uzbekistan due to the ongoing Tajik civil war, and finally, in 2019, he was granted Uzbek citizenship.

He trained boxing in his youth before transitioning to kickboxing and became Junior Uzbek Kickboxing Champion under K-1 rules.

Muradov was forced to drop out of school and start working at the age of 15 to provide for his family after his father got involved in a car accident that left him permanently disabled. At the age of 17, he began his successful combat sambo career, and because of that, he earned a well-paid job as a security guard in Russian Siberia. He was seriously stabbed and shot several times while working there.
When his father got released from hospital after four years, his family had to sell their apartment to pay for healthcare bills. Muradov returned to Uzbekistan, and eventually managed to make enough money from competing in combat sambo to be able to buy the apartment back. However, by his account, it was hard to get a good job without contacts, so in 2011, then 19 years old Muradov moved to the Czech Republic in search of a better-paying job. There, he worked various jobs such as construction site worker, cleaner, and waiter. He started training Muay Thai and MMA in Prague under the tutelage of Petr Kníže, who allowed Muradov to train and sleep in his gym for free and also helped him get a more comfortable job as a bouncer. Muradov then started his professional MMA career in 2012.

Mixed martial arts career

Early career
In September 2015 Muradov fought at WAKO K1 European Cup 2015 tournament and lost in the first match against Polish champion Bartosz Dołbień by unanimous decision.

In February 2018 Muradov became the world's first mixed martial artist signed by Floyd Mayweather Jr.'s The Money Team. They became friends after they met each other at Prague's Lávka Club in March 2017.

Before entering the UFC, Muradov held a 22–6 MMA record and won multiple regional middleweight championships (XFN, WKN, Caveam, WASO).

Ultimate Fighting Championship

2019

Muradov made his promotional debut against Alessio Di Chirico on September 28, 2019, at UFC Fight Night 160 as a replacement for injured Peter Sobotta. He took the fight on 12 days notice. He won the fight via unanimous decision.

As of September 29, 2019, he was ranked #1 in the Tapology's Eastern European middleweight rankings.

In his second UFC fight, on December 7, 2019, at UFC on ESPN 7, Muradov faced Trevor Smith as a replacement for Alonzo Menifield. He won via KO in the third round and was awarded a Performance of the Night bonus.

In the official UFC 2019 year-end list of the Ten Best Newcomers, Muradov was ranked #7.

2020
Muradov was scheduled to face Antônio Carlos Júnior on March 14, 2020, at UFC Fight Night 170, as a replacement for Brad Tavares who had to pull out due to an anterior cruciate ligament (ACL) injury. In turn, Carlos Júnior suffered from an unspecified injury and the bout was cancelled from the event.

Muradov was expected to face Karl Roberson on April 18, 2020, at UFC 249. However, Muradov was forced to pull from the event due to COVID-19 pandemic travel restriction, and Roberson was pulled from the event and was scheduled to meet Marvin Vettori on April 25, 2020.

On October 18, 2020 at UFC Fight Night 180, Muradov was expected to face Krzysztof Jotko. However, the fight was rescheduled for October 31 at UFC Fight Night 181, but Jotko was pulled from the fight, citing injury, and he was replaced by Kevin Holland. Muradov was then also pulled from the fight after testing positive for COVID-19 and he was replaced by newcomer Charlie Ontiveros.

2021
Muradov faced Andrew Sanchez on January 24, 2021 at UFC 257, as a replacement for André Muniz. He won the fight via technical knockout in round three. This win earned him the Performance of the Night  award.

Muradov  faced Gerald Meerschaert on August 28, 2021, at UFC on ESPN 30.  He lost the fight via rear-naked choke submission in round two.

Muradov was scheduled to face  Misha Cirkunov on February 26, 2022, at UFC Fight Night 202. However, Muradov pulled out in late January due to a hand injury and he was replaced by Wellington Turman.

2022 
Muradov was scheduled to face Abusupiyan Magomedov on September 3, 2022, at UFC Fight Night 209. However, Muradov withdrew due to injury was replaced by Dustin Stoltzfus.

Muradov faced Caio Borralho on October 22, 2022, at UFC 280. He lost the bout via unanimous decision.

2023 
Muradov was expected to face Abusupiyan Magomedov on March 11, 2023 at UFC Fight Night: Yan vs. Dvalishvili. At the end of February, it was announced that Muradov had pulled out of the bout again.

Personal life
A professional MMA competitor since 2012, Muradov is both the first Tajik-born and Uzbek UFC fighter, and the world's first mixed martial artist signed by Floyd Mayweather Jr.'s The Money Team.

Besides his native Uzbek, Muradov speaks Czech, Russian and English and is conversational in Polish and Arabic.

Muradov is a non-denominational Muslim and he does not strictly observe the Ramadan fast.

Since 2018, he has been dating Monika Bagárová, a Czech singer of Romani descent. On May 27, 2020, Bagárová gave birth to their first child, a daughter named Rumia. The couple split up in December 2021, however in February 2022 Bagárová confirmed they had reconciled. They separated again in July 2022.

Muradov has stated multiple times that he is very patriotic towards the Czech lands and Prague. He called himself an “Uzbek with a Czech heart” or a “Czech from Uzbekistan”, and also a “Czech representative” and a “proud Praguer”. Because of that, Muradov turned down Floyd Mayweather Jr.'s offer to permanently relocate from Prague to Las Vegas in Nevada, where he is training at both the Dewey "Black Kobra" Cooper's gym and the Mayweather Boxing Club, as well as working for Mayweather Jr. himself.

During his early time in Prague, Muradov appeared in autoerotic porn productions and solo softcore porn photo shoots under the stage name "Akhmed Virt" for William Higgins' gay pornographic production company.

Championships and accomplishments

Mixed martial arts
Ultimate Fighting Championship
Performance of the Night (Two times) vs. Trevor Smith and Andrew Sanchez
X FIGHT NIGHTS
XFN Middleweight Championship (One time)
One successful title defense
Interim XFN Middleweight Championship (One time)
World Kickboxing Network
WKN MMA International Middleweight Championship (One time)
Caveam
Caveam National Middleweight Championship (Champion of Caveam) (One time)
World Association of Sporting Organizations
WASO MMA European Middleweight Championship (One time)

Kickboxing
Uzbekistan Kickboxing Federation
Junior National K-1 Kickboxing Champion  (One time)

Mixed martial arts record

|-
|Loss
|align=center|25–8
|Caio Borralho
|Decision (unanimous)
|UFC 280
|
|align=center|3
|align=center|5:00
|Abu Dhabi, United Arab Emirates
|
|-
|Loss
|align=center|25–7
|Gerald Meerschaert
|Submission (rear-naked choke)
|UFC on ESPN: Barboza vs. Chikadze
|
|align=center|2
|align=center|1:49
|Las Vegas, Nevada, United States
|
|-
|Win
|align=center|25–6
|Andrew Sanchez
|TKO (flying knee and punches)
|UFC 257
|
|align=center|3
|align=center|2:59
|Abu Dhabi, United Arab Emirates
|
|-
| Win
| align=center|24–6
| Trevor Smith
| KO (punch)
| UFC on ESPN: Overeem vs. Rozenstruik 
| 
| align=center|3
| align=center|4:09
| Washington, D.C., United States
| 
|-
| Win
| align=center|23–6
| Alessio Di Chirico
| Decision (unanimous)
| UFC Fight Night: Hermansson vs. Cannonier 
| 
| align=center|3
| align=center|5:00
| Copenhagen, Denmark
|
|-
| Win
| align=center|22–6
| Wendell de Oliveira Marques
| KO (punches)
| Oktagon 13
| 
| align=center|2
| align=center|1:56
| Prague, Czech Republic
|
|-
| Win
| align=center|21–6
| Alberto Emiliano Pereira
| TKO (punches)
| Oktagon 12
| 
| align=center| 1
| align=center| 3:34
| Bratislava, Slovakia
|
|-
| Win
| align=center| 20–6
| Tato Primera	
| KO (punch)
| Night of Warriors 15
| 
| align=center|2
| align=center|0:18
| Liberec, Czech Republic
| 
|-
| Win
| align=center| 19–6
| Diego Gonzalez
| Decision (unanimous)
| XFN 17
| 
| align=center|3
| align=center|5:00
| Brno, Czech Republic
|
|-
| Win
| align=center| 18–6
| Grzegorz Siwy
| KO (punch)
| XFN 15
| 
| align=center| 3
| align=center| 4:50
| Prague, Czech Republic
|
|-
| Win
| align=center|17–6
| Deyan Topalski
| TKO (punches)
| XFN 12
| 
| align=center| 1
| align=center| 4:27
| Prague, Czech Republic
|
|-
| Win
| align=center|16–6
| David Ramires
| TKO (punches)
| XFN 11: Back to the O2 Arena
| 
| align=center|2
| align=center|0:30
| Prague, Czech Republic
|
|-
| Win
| align=center|15–6
| Edvaldo de Oliveira
| TKO (elbows)
| XFN 8: Vémola vs. Sloane
| 
| align=center|2
| align=center|4:42
| Pardubice, Czech Republic
| 
|-
| Win
| align=center|14–6
| Tomáš Penz
| TKO (punches)
| XFN 6
| 
| align=center|1
| align=center|4:20
| Prague, Czech Republic
|
|-
| Win
| align=center|13–6
| Zoran Dod
| Decision (unanimous)
| XFN 3
| 
| align=center| 3
| align=center| 5:00
| Prague, Czech Republic
|
|-
| Win
| align=center| 12–6
| Shota Gvasalia	
| TKO (punches)
| Simply the Best 14
| 
| align=center|3
| align=center|2:07
| Prague, Czech Republic
|
|-
| Loss
| align=center| 11–6
| David Ramires
| TKO (clavicle injury)
| XFN 2
| 
| align=center|2
| align=center|1:19
| Prague, Czech Republic
|
|-
| Win
| align=center| 11–5
| Damian Chandzel
| Submission (choke)
| Night of Warriors 10
| 
| align=center| 1
| align=center| 1:36
| Liberec, Czech Republic
| 
|-
| Win
| align=center| 10–5
| Rafael Silva
| Decision (unanimous)
| XFN 1
| 
| align=center| 3
| align=center| 5:00
| Prague, Czech Republic
| 
|-
| Win
| align=center| 9–5
| Tomáš Kužela
| Decision (unanimous)
| Night of Warriors 9
| 
| align=center| 3
| align=center| 5:00
| Prague, Czech Republic
|
|-
| Win
| align=center| 8–5
| Andreas Birgels
| TKO (punches)
| Caveam: Bitva Roku 2015
| 
| align=center| 3
| align=center| 3:35
| Prague, Czech Republic
|
|-
| Loss
| align=center| 7–5
| Maciej Różański
| Decision (unanimous)
| Fighting Zone: Cage Time 1
| 
| align=center| 3
| align=center| 5:00
| Prague, Czech Republic
|
|-
| Win
| align=center|7–4
| István Tóth
| Submission (rear-naked choke)
| CMTA Pardál Gladiators Night Cage 3
| 
| align=center|1
| align=center|2:20
| České Budějovice, Czech Republic
|
|-
| Win
| align=center|6–4
| Krzysztof Klepacz
| TKO (punches)
| MMAA Aréna 3
| 
| align=center|1
| align=center|3:48
| Hradec Králové, Czech Republic
|
|-
| Win
| align=center|5–4
| Peter Čapkovič
| Submission (guillotine choke)
| Fight Explosion: Return Of Kings
| 
| align=center|2
| align=center|2:37
| Bratislava, Slovakia
|
|-
| Loss
| align= center|4–4 
| Livio Victoriano
| Submission (triangle choke)
| MMAA Aréna 2: Vémola vs. Kníže
| 
| align=center|1
| align=center|3:40
| Prague, Czech Republic
|
|-
| Loss
| align=center| 4–3
| Maciej Różański
| Submission (guillotine choke)
| BA 3: The Rebirth
| 
| align=center|2
| align=center|0:45
| Goleniów, Poland
| 
|-
| Win
| align=center| 4–2
| Pavol Langer
| TKO (punches)
| CMTA Trutnovs Night Of Gladiators
|
| align=center| 1
| align=center| 3:30
|Trutnov, Czech Republic
|
|-
| Loss
| align=center| 3–2
| Marcin Krysztofiak
| Decision (split)
| MFC 5
| 
| align=center| 2
| align=center| 5:00
| Nowa Sól, Poland
| 
|-
| Win
| align=center| 3–1
| Christoph Steinmann
| Decision (unanimous)
| Cage XFC: International Lake Constance Cup 2
| 
| align=center| 1
| align=center| N/A
| Lochau, Austria
| 
|-
| Loss
| align=center| 2–1
| Kamil Cibiński
| Submission (armbar)
| MMAA Aréna
| 
| align=center| 1
| align=center| 1:57
| Prague, Czech Republic
| 
|-
| Win
| align=center| 2–0
| Francisco Silva
| TKO (punches)
| CMTA Pardál Gladiators Night Cage
| 
| align=center| 3
| align=center| 1:05
| České Budějovice, Czech Republic
|
|-
| Win
| align=center| 1–0
| Patrik Jevický
| TKO (punches)
| K1 Empress League: Round 2
| 
| align=center| 1
| align=center| 0:26
| Košice, Slovakia
|

KMM record

| Win
| align=center|2–0
| Nordin Bouhaddaoui
| TKO (elbows)
| Souboj Titánů 2016
| 
| align=center|3
| align=center|1:38
| Plzeň, Czech Republic
| 
|-
| Win
| align=center|1–0
| Róbert Kertész
| TKO (punches)
| Souboj Titánů 2015
| 
| align=center|3
| align=center|N/A
| Plzeň, Czech Republic
| 
|}
1.KMM (Kickboxing–Muaythai–MMA) uses hybrid ruleset: first round is conducted under the WAKO's K-1 Rules, second round under the IFMA's Muaythai Rules and third round under the Unified Rules of MMA.

See also
 List of current UFC fighters
 List of male mixed martial artists

References

External links
 
 

1990 births
Living people
Tajikistani Civil War refugees
Sportspeople from Prague
Sportspeople from Bukhara
Sportspeople from Dushanbe
Middleweight kickboxers
Middleweight mixed martial artists
Mixed martial artists utilizing kickboxing
Mixed martial artists utilizing sambo
Uzbekistani male mixed martial artists
Uzbekistani male kickboxers
Uzbekistani sambo practitioners
Tajikistani people of Uzbek descent
Uzbekistani people of Tajik descent
Czech male mixed martial artists
Czech male kickboxers
Czech sambo practitioners
Ultimate Fighting Championship male fighters